is a junction railway station in the city of Kaminoyama, Yamagata, Japan, operated by the East Japan Railway Company (JR East).

Lines
Kaminoyama-Onsen Station is served by the Ōu Main Line (Yamagata Line) and the Yamagata Shinkansen. It is 75.0 rail kilometers from the terminus of both lines at Fukushima Station.

Station layout
The station has a single side platform and a single island platform connected to the station building by a footbridge. The station has a Midori no Madoguchi staffed ticket office.

Platforms

History
It was absorbed into the JR East network upon the privatization of JNR on 1 April 1987. Kaminoyama Station was renamed Kaminoyama-Onsen Station on 1 July 1992, coinciding with the opening of the Yamagata Shinkansen. A new station building was completed in June 2004.

Passenger statistics
In fiscal 2018, the station was used by an average of 1521 passengers daily (boarding passengers only).

Surrounding area
 Kaminoyama City Hall
 Kaminoyama Post Office
 Kaminoyama Castle
 Kaminoyama Onsen

References

External links

 JR East station information 

Stations of East Japan Railway Company
Yamagata Shinkansen
Railway stations in Yamagata Prefecture
Ōu Main Line
Railway stations in Japan opened in 1901
Kaminoyama, Yamagata